Fireworks is the first EP by English rock band Embrace, released in May 1997. It was their first release to reach the top 40 in the UK, at No. 34. It consisted of 3 songs from the debut album The Good Will Out, which reached No. 1 on the UK Albums Chart. It was mixed by renowned dub and electronic musician Ott. The popular and well recognised B-side, "Blind", was released on the North American version of the album.

Track listing

References

1997 debut EPs
Embrace (English band) albums
Hut Records EPs